George Smilovici is a Cuban-born Australian comedian. He is the son of Romanian-Jewish immigrant parents who left Romania and first settled in Cuba, from 1946 till 1959 when they fled Fidel Castro's revolution to El Salvador, and Guatemala, and later moved to Sydney, Australia when Smilovici was 6 years old. Smilovici is best known for his comic monologue "I'm Tuff". "I'm Tuff" peaked a at number 10 and was the 96th biggest selling single in Australia in 1984.

Discography

Studio albums

Singles

References

External links 
Talent On Line Entertainment Network: George Smilovici
Vanish Entertainment: George Smilovici
Bluesfest Tsunami Fundraiser Raises One Hundred Thousand Dollars
Ovations: George Smilovici

Year of birth missing (living people)
Living people
Australian Jews
Australian people of Romanian-Jewish descent
Australian stand-up comedians
Cuban emigrants to Australia
Cuban Jews
Cuban people of Romanian-Jewish descent
Jewish Australian comedians
Australian male comedians